The Real Housewives of Bangkok is an upcoming Thai reality television series. It is produced by Kantana Group in partnership with NBC Universal International Studios. The Real Housewives of Bangkok focuses on the personal and professional lives of several women living in Bangkok, Thailand.

Overview and casting
On 8 December 2016, it was announced that NBCUniversal International Formats had signed a deal, brokered by Linfield Ng, with production company Kantana Group to produce the first Asian installment of The Real Housewives franchise, set in Bangkok. Yvonne Pilkington, senior vice president at NBCUniversal International Formats, described the franchise as a television phenomenon that has extended across the globe, and The Real Housewives of Bangkok would serve as the first installment in the franchise to be based in Asia. Pilkington describe the series as a fascinating chance to see culturally contrasting nature of the production and the housewives. The production company has gone on to express their excitement in the partnership with NBC Universal and their willingness to create a successful series as well as describing the franchise as highly successful. The series will consist of a total thirteen episodes. The cast will be revealed in late August 2022 and season 1 is set to premiere in late September or early October.

References

External links

Thai reality television series
Television shows set in Bangkok
Bangkok
Thai television series based on American television series
Women in Thailand